Muhammad Taqi-ud-Din bin Abdil-Qadir Al-Hilali (1893–1987) was a 20th-century Moroccan Salafi, most notable for his English translations of Sahih Bukhari and, along with Muhammad Muhsin Khan, the Qur'an, entitled The Noble Qur'an.

Biography

Early life and education
Hilali was born in Rissani, Morocco, near the oasis of Tafilalt in a valley near Sajalmasah in 1893 (1311 AH).

In his twenties, Hilali moved to Algeria in order to study Muslim Jurisprudence, moving on to Egypt in 1922. While there, Hilali enrolled in Al-Azhar University only to drop out after being disappointed with the curriculum. Instead, Hilali spent time under the tutelage of Rashid Rida, then returned to Morocco that same year to finish his Bachelor of Arts degree at the University of al-Karaouine. Responding to a call by Muslim Brotherhood founder Hassan al-Banna for Muslim intellectuals of Morocco to share ideas with those elsewhere, Hilali wrote a number of letters to the organization's magazine which were intercepted by authorities of the French colonial empire. Arrested and held for three days without charge, Hilali's release was secured and he fled Morocco. Shortly after he escaped the country, he was sentenced to death in absentia for subversive activity against the French protectorate of Morocco.

In Asia and Europe
After performing the pilgrimage to Mecca, Hilali moved to India in order to pursue Hadith studies. While there, he worked as head of Arabic studies at Darul-uloom Nadwatul Ulama in Lucknow. After completing his study in India, Hilali spent three years in Iraq before being personally invited by first King of Saudi Arabia Ibn Saud to teach in the Muslim holy land. Hilali taught and led the prayer in Medina at Al-Masjid an-Nabawi, Islam's second holiest site, for two years and taught in Mecca at Masjid al-Haram, Islam's most holy site, for one more year.

After finishing his duration of teaching in Mecca, Hilali enrolled in Baghdad University; he also served as an assistant professor while there. Hilali returned briefly to India for a second time, and enrolled in the University of Lucknow as both a student and a teacher, the most prominent of his own being Abul Hasan Ali Hasani Nadwi. Shakib Arslan, who was a close friend of Hilali, went through a contact at the German Foreign Office and helped Hilali enroll (again, both as a student and a teacher) at the University of Bonn. A disciple of Rashid Rida, the Salafi scholar and anti-colonial activist who began teaching Arabic at Bonn University in 1936 and became the head of the cultural department of the Foreign Office's Islamic Central Institute, as well as a Radio Berlin broadcaster in Arabic. In 1942, Amin al-Husayni sent him to Morocco to organize covert operations.

Return to Morocco, then Iraq, then Morocco, then Saudi Arabia, then Morocco
Toward the end of World War II, Hilali left Germany for French Morocco, which was rocked with calls for independence. He returned to Iraq in 1947, once again taking up a teaching position at the university in Baghdad. After the 14 July Revolution, Hilali returned to a now-independent Kingdom of Morocco one more time. He was appointed to a teaching position at Mohammed V University in Rabat in 1959 and later at a branch in Fes.

In 1968, Saudi Arabian Grand Mufti Abd al-Aziz ibn Baz wrote to Hilali requesting that he take up a teaching position at Islamic University of Madinah, of which Bin Baz was the president. Hilali accepted, living in Saudi Arabia for one more time between 1968 and 1974.

In 1974, Hilali permanently retired from teaching, moving to Meknes initially and later to Casablanca, where he owned a house. Hilali died at June 22, 1987 (25th of Shawal in the year 1408 AH). He was buried in the neighborhood of Sbata.

Reception
Views on Hilali within the Muslim world itself - specifically within Sunni Islam - have been positive.
Algerian national hero Abdelhamid Ben Badis, in particular,  considered Hilali to be one of the most knowledgeable Muslim of their era.

Hilali was criticized by a number of Muslim scholars and Western academics due to his translation of the Qur'an. Dr. Ahmed Farouk Musa, an academician at Monash University, considered the Hilali-Khan translation as being a major cause of extremism and a work of propaganda distributed by Saudi religious authorities with money from its oil-rich government. Similarly, Imad-ad-Dean Ahmad, head of Bethesda's Minaret of Freedom Institute, has falsely claimed that the translation is a Wahabi rendering of the Qur'an and is not accepted by Muslims in the US.

Since Hilali's translation is based on the classical tafsir (Qur'anic commentary), most of those who criticized his translation had ulterior motives.
 
Additionally, Khaled Abou El Fadl and Khaleel Mohammed criticized Hilali's translation as being a distortion of the meaning of the Qur'an

A number of academics have also criticized the Hilali-Khan translation on stylistic and linguistic grounds. Dr William S. Peachy, an American professor of English at College of Medicine, King Saud University at Qasseem considered the translation "repulsive" and rejected by anyone outside of Saudi Arabia. Dr. Abdel-Haleem, Arabic Professor at SOAS, London University, noted that he found the Hilali-Khan translation "repelling". The Director of King Fahd International Centre for Translation, King Saud University, Riyad, Dr. A. Al-Muhandis, expressed his dissatisfaction with the translation's style and language, being too poor and simplistic.

Works
Hilali worked with Muhammad Muhsin Khan in the English translation of the meanings of the Qur'an and Sahih Al-Bukhari. Their translation of the Qur'an has been described as ambitious, incorporating commentary from Tafsir al-Tabari, Tafsir ibn Kathir, Tafsir al-Qurtubi and Sahih al-Bukhari. It has also been criticized for inserting the interpretations of the Salafi school directly into the English rendition of the Qur'an. It has been accused of inculcating Muslims and potential Muslims with militant interpretations of Islam through parenthesis, as teachings of the Qur'an itself.

Personal life
Hilali was an adherent of the Zahirite school of Islamic law according to his children and students. Administrators of his website edited his biography to remove all references to his adherence to the school, with which modern-day Zahirites took issue.

See also
Abd Al-Aziz Fawzan Al-Fawzan
Muhammad Muhsin Khan
Muhammad bin Jamil Zeno
Saleh Al-Fawzan

References

External links
Al-Hilali website (Arabic)
Biography of Al-Hilali
Dr. Muhammand Taqi-Ud-Din Al-Hilali Bibliography on LibraryThing
Abdessamad El Amraoui: "Authentic Islam”. The religious profile of Taqī al-Dīn al-Hilālī (1893-1987) as reflected in his fatwas. Dissertation Leiden University, 2015

Moroccan Sunni Muslim scholars of Islam
Alumni of the University of Wales
Translators of the Quran into English
1987 deaths
People from Sijilmasa
19th-century Moroccan people
Humboldt University of Berlin alumni
University of al-Qarawiyyin alumni
Academic staff of Mohammed V University
Moroccan Salafis
Zahiris
Salafi Islamists
20th-century translators
1893 births
20th-century Moroccan people